The .300 Ruger Compact Magnum or .300 RCM is a rimless, short-length rifle cartridge designed for the hunting of Medium-to-Large-sized North American game. It is designed to closely duplicate the performance of the historic .300 Winchester Magnum cartridge, yet to be chambered in a short length action rifle. The cartridge was designed by Hornady and Sturm Ruger in partnership and released commercially in 2008 and chambered in various Ruger rifles.

Design & Specifications
The .300 Ruger Compact Magnum uses a unique case designed by Hornady and Ruger based on the powerful .375 Ruger cartridge. This allows the cartridge to have a greater case capacity than a belted magnum case given cases of equal length. Unlike Winchester Short Magnum cartridges, the Ruger Compact Magnums share the same diameter from case head to body. This allowed Ruger to chamber the cartridge without extensively redesigning their M77 rifle to adopt them to the new Ruger cartridge.

While the .300 H&H Magnum is longer than the .300 Ruger Compact Magnum, the latter cartridge has a greater case capacity than the former. This is due to the .300 H&H Magnum having a long tapered body while the .300 Ruger Compact Magnum follows modern cartridge designs in that it has very little taper and a sharper shoulder. The dimensioned drawing is of the parent case .375 Ruger.

Performance 
Hornady manufactures ammunition for the .300 Ruger Compact Magnum cartridge. The.300 Ruger Compact Magnum's greater case capacity, and the "short fat" cartridge efficiency lead to increases in the neighborhood of 150 fps over the H&H cartridge and is essentially the same performance as the .300 Winchester Magnum or .300 WSM.

See also 
 Table of handgun and rifle cartridges

References

 C.I.P. TDCC (Tables of Dimensions of Cartridges and Chambers) .300 RCM

Sturm, Ruger & Company
Pistol and rifle cartridges